This a list of programs broadcast by the Central Nacional de Televisão, more known as Rede CNT and CNT, a Brazilian television network.

Current programs

Journalistic shows 
 CNT Entrevista
 CNT Jornal (1993–present)
 CNT Notícias
 Jogo do Poder (2007-present)

Sportive shows 
 CNT Esporte (2008–present)
 Deconto Show de Pesca (2006–present)
 Tempo Extra (2018-present)
 WooHoo

Varieties and other shows 
 Del Rubens Show
 Família Zoreia
 Otávio Neto na TV (1995–present)
 Programa do Ramy
 Qual Viagem
 Tatti Show
 Terroir Brasileiro
 Tudo & + 1 Pouco

Locals 
 CNT Rio de Janeiro
 Fala Baixada

 CNT Londrina
 Cidadão Tropical
 Militão & Militão

 CNT Caxias do Sul
 Confraria Oli Paz
 Programa Oli Paz

 CNT Salvador
 Vision Surf

Upcoming programs 

 Panico na CNT (Mid 2022)
 The Super Mario Super Show (Mid 2023)
 Zomaship'' (Mid 2024)

References 

Rede CNT
Rede CNT